Gonzo is the fifth studio album by American rock band Foxy Shazam. The album was announced and self-released for free online downloads on April 2, 2014. A limited quantity of the album was also made available on vinyl records. The band supported Gonzo on their headlining "Gonzo Tour" from May to August 2014 across the United States.

Recording and production
Gonzo was recorded, in its entirety, in a single room in Chicago, Illinois and produced by Steve Albini. The majority of the instrumentals and vocals on the album were recorded in the same room at the same time; only one overdub was used on the entire record. When asked why Foxy Shazam decided to record with Steve Albini, lead singer Eric Nally stated that they chose Albini because, "he's really the only person around nowadays on his level who just records. He doesn't try to stick his hands in any creativeness. He just captures what you're doing, in a really amazing way."

Track listing
All songs written and composed by Foxy Shazam.

Personnel
Foxy Shazam
Eric Sean Nally - Vocals
Sky White - Keyboards
Daisy Caplan - Bass
Loren Turner - Guitar
Alex Nauth - Horns/Backing vocals
Aaron McVeigh - Drums

References

2014 albums
Foxy Shazam albums
albums produced by Steve Albini